George Daniel Smith (August 24, 1912 – January 14, 1996) was an American basketball coach and college athletic administrator.  He served as the head basketball coach at the University of Cincinnati from 1952 to 1960, compiling a record of 154–56.  Smith was the athletic director at Cincinnati from 1960 to 1973.  He died of cancer at the age of 83, on January 14, 1996.

Head coaching record

See also
 List of NCAA Division I men's basketball tournament Final Four appearances by coach

References

1912 births
1996 deaths
Cincinnati Bearcats athletic directors
Cincinnati Bearcats football coaches
Cincinnati Bearcats football players
Cincinnati Bearcats men's basketball coaches